Bangladesh Army Welfare Trust is a trust owned and operated by the Bangladesh Army. It owns a number of businesses including hotels, gas stations, and golf clubs. In 2021, The Economist placed the value of the trust holdings at US$700 million.

History
The Bangladesh Army Welfare Trust was established in June 1998. In 1999 the trust established Trust Bank Limited. The BBC estimated the commercial enterprise of the Bangladesh Army to be over 30 billion taka. The trust was founded to look after the interests and welfare of retired military personnel. The organizations under the trust include hotels, golf clubs, filling stations, Trust Bank Limited and shopping complex. In 2009, the trust provided 40 percent of the funding for Dhaka Metro Rail.

The trust started a bus service in 2014. The trust owns the Radisson Hotel in Dhaka and Chittagong. The land for the hotel was leased to the trust by the Bangladesh Army for a relatively low price. The hotels are owned by Sena Hotel Developments Limited which is a subsidiary of the trust and Sena Kalyan Sangstha.

The BBC did a 9-part documentary called Probaho that examined military commercial ventures including those of the trust. Mongla Cement is owned by the trust. The involvement of the trust and the Bangladesh Army in business has faced criticism. The director of the trust is a director of Bangladesh Army University of Engineering & Technology.

In December 2020, Bangladesh Army Welfare Trust signed a billion dollar agreement with Singapore based Raffles Infrastructure Holdings and Cupertino Power Limited, based in Bangladesh, to develop a residential area in Baunia called Trust Green City. It will be near Mirpur DOHS and Uttara Thana. Astha Life Insurance Company Limited was launched in 2020. It signed an agreement with Sikder Group to build a luxury resort in Bandarban which will destroy six villages of the Mro tribe and violate local laws.

Bangladesh Army Welfare Trust signed an agreement with Eleris Energy Limited, a United States based company, to build a solar energy power plant in February 2022. Brigadier General Abul Mansur Md Ashraf Khan, managing director of Bangladesh Army Welfare Trust, signed the agreement on behalf of the trust.

Businesses 
 Trust Innovation Limited
 Jol Torongo-Laboni Beach
 Mongla Cement Factory
 Trust Bank Limited
 Astha Life Insurance Company Limited
 Trust Green City
 Trust Overseas Recruiting Agency
 Army Medical College, Jashore
 Radisson Blu Dhaka Water Garden
 Radisson Blu Hotel, Chittagong
 Army Shopping Complex
 Sena Hotel Development Limited
 Sena Filling Station
 Trust Filling and CNG Station
 Kurmitola Golf Club
 Savar Golf Club
 Taxi service with Toma Paribahan
 Projonmo Student Hostel

See also 
 Sena Kalyan Sangstha
 Retired Armed Forces Officer's Welfare Association
 Sena Paribar Kalyan Samity

References

Politics of Bangladesh
Military of Bangladesh
Government agencies of Bangladesh
1988 establishments in Bangladesh